The 2002–03 Danish Superliga season was the 13th season of the Danish Superliga league championship, governed by the Danish Football Association. It took place from the first match on July 27, 2002 to final match on June 22, 2003.

The Danish champions qualified for the second UEFA Champions League 2003-04 qualification round, while the second and third placed teams qualified for the first qualification round of the UEFA Cup 2003-04. The two lowest placed teams of the tournament were directly relegated to the Danish 1st Division. Likewise, the Danish 1st Division champions and runners-up were promoted to the Superliga.

Table

Results

Top goal scorers

See also
 2002–03 in Danish football

External links
  Fixtures at NetSuperligaen.dk
  Onside.dk by Viasat
  Peders Fodboldstatistik

Danish Superliga seasons
1
Denmark